Atagema ornata is a species of sea slug or dorid nudibranch, a marine gastropod mollusc in the family Discodorididae. It has been considered to be synonymous with Atagema intecta by some authors.

Distribution
This species was described from the Red Sea and is known from the Indian and western Pacific Oceans.

Ecology
This dorid nudibranch feeds on sponges.

References

Discodorididae
Molluscs of the Indian Ocean
Molluscs of the Pacific Ocean
Fauna of the Red Sea
Gastropods described in 1831
Taxa named by Christian Gottfried Ehrenberg